Map of places in the Scottish Borders compiled from this list
See the list of places in Scotland for places in other counties.

This list of places in the Scottish Borders includes towns, villages, hamlets, castles, golf courses, historic houses, hillforts, lighthouses, nature reserves, reservoirs, rivers, and other places of interest in the Scottish Borders council area of Scotland.

A
Abbey Mill 
Abbey St. Bathans
Abbotsford Ferry railway station, Abbotsford House
Abbotrule 
Addinston 
Aikwood Tower
Ale Water
Alemoor Loch
Allanbank 
Allanshaugh 
Allanshaws
Allanton
Ancrum, Ancrum Old Parish Church
Anglo-Scottish Border
Appletreehall 
Ashiestiel 
Ashkirk
Auchencrow
Ayton, Ayton Castle, Ayton Parish Church, Ayton railway station

B
Baddinsgill, Baddinsgill Reservoir
Bairnkine
Bassendean
Battle of Ancrum Moor
Battle of Humbleton Hill
Battle of Nesbit Moor (1355)
Battle of Nesbit Moor (1402)
Battle of Philiphaugh
Bedrule 
Bedshiel
Belses, Belses railway station
Bellspool
Bemersyde, Bemersyde House, Bemersyde Moss
Berwickshire Railway
Birgham
Blackadder, Blackadder Water 
Blackcastle Rings
Blanerne Castle 
Blyth Bridge
Boleside
Bonchester Bridge
Bonjedward
Bonkyl Kirk
Boon Farm
Borders Abbeys Way 
Bordlands
Borthwick Water
Bothwell Water
Bow Castle Broch
Bowden
Bowerhope
Bowhill, Bowhill House
Bowismiln
Bowmont Water 
Bowshank
Branxholme, Branxholme Castle 
Bridgelands
Broad Law
Broadhaugh 
Broadmeadows
Brotherstone Hill
Broughton
Baccleuch
Buckholm
Burnfoot
Burnmouth 
Buxley

C
Caddon Water
Caddonfoot
Caddonlee
Caerlanrig
Camptown
Cappercleuch
Carcant
Cardrona, Cardrona Forest
Carlops
Carolside
Carter Bar
Castle Holydean
Castlecraig 
Castleton
Cavers
Cessford, Cessford Burn, Cessford Castle
Chambers Institution
Chesters Estate
Cheviot Hills
Chirnside, Chirnside Parish Church
Chirnsidebridge
Clappers
Clintmains
Clovenfords
Cockburnspath
Coldingham, Coldingham Bay, Coldingham Loch, Coldingham Priory
Coldstream, Coldstream Guards Museum 
Cor Water
Cove
Craigierig
Craik, Craik Forest
Crailing
Crailinghall
Cranshaws
Cringletie
Crook Inn
Crosshall Cross

D
Darnhall Mains
Darnick
Dawyck Botanic Garden, Dawyck Chapel, Dawyck House
Debatable lands
Denholm
Dere Street
Dewar, Dewar Burn, Dewar Hill, Dewar Water
Dinlabyre
Dirrington Great Law, Dirrington Little Law
Dodcleugh
Drumelzier
Drumlanrig Tower
Dryburgh, Dryburgh Abbey, Dryburgh Abbey Hotel, Dryburgh Bridge
Dryhope, Dryhope Tower
Dun Law
Dunglass Viaduct
Duns, Duns Castle, Duns Castle nature reserve, Duns Law 
Dunse Spa
Dye Water

E
Earlston, Earlston railway station
Eccles
Eckford
Eddleston, Eddleston Water
Eden Water
Edgerston, Edgerston House, Edgerston Mill
Edin's Hall Broch
Ednam, Ednam Church
Edrington
Edrom
Eildon Hill
Ettleton
Ettrick, Ettrick Forest, Ettrick Kirk, Ettrick Marshes, Ettrick Water
Ettrickbridge 
Eye Water
Eyemouth, Eyemouth Museum

F
Falahill
Faldonside
Falnash
Fast Castle
Fatlips Castle
Faughill
Ferniehirst Castle
Fishwick
Floors Castle
Fogo, Fogo Priory
Foulden
Fountainhall 
Fruid Water
Fulton Tower

G
Gala Water, Galashiels, Galashiels Baptist Church, Galashiels railway station
Garvald
Gattonside, Gattonside Suspension Bridge
Gavington
George Meikle Kemp Memorial
Gilmanscleuch
Gilston
Glen Ho
Glenbreck
Glenholm
Glentress, Glentress Forest
Gordon, Gordon Moss
Gorrenberry
Grantshouse
Greenknowe Tower
Greenlaw
Greycrook
Gunsgreen House

H
Hadrian's Wall
Halidon Hill
Halldean Mill
Halliwell House Museum
Hallrule
Hallyards
Hallyne
Hare and Dunhog Mosses
Harecleugh Forest
Harestanes, Harestanes Visitor Centre
Harmony Garden
Harwood on Teviot
Hassendean, Hassendean railway station
Hawick, Hawick railway station
Hawkshaw
Headshaw Hill
Heiton
Heriot, Heriot railway station, Heriot Water
Hermitage, Hermitage Castle, Hermitage Water
Heugh Head
Hillhouse
Hillslay Tower
Hilton
The Hirsel, Hirsel Homestead Museum
Hobkirk
Holms Water
Holylee
Hornhole Battle Site
Horsburgh Castle
Horseley Hill
Hoselaw Loch and Din Moss
Houndslow
Housesteads Roman Fort
Hownam
Hume, Hume Castle
Hurkar Rocks
Hutton
Hyndhope

I
Innerleithen

J
James Hutton Trail
James Thomson Memorial
Jed Water, Jedburgh, 
Jedburgh Abbey
Jedburgh Castle

Jedburgh Greyfriars
Jedburgh Town Hall
Jim Clark Room
John Buchan Centre, John Buchan Way
Johnnie Armstrong's Grave

K
Kailzie Gardens
Kaim Knowe
Kale Water
Kalemouth, Kalemouth Suspension Bridge, 
Kelloe House
Kelso, Kelso Abbey, Kelso Racecourse
Kershope Burn
Kilbucho
Killochyett
Kilnsike Tower
Kimmerghame House
Kingledoors
Kirk Yetholm
Kirkbride Parish Church
Kirkburn
Kirkhope, Kirkhope Law, Kirkhope Tower
Kirkhouse
Kirkton
Kirktonhill
Kirkurd
Kirna House (The Kirna, also Grangehill)

L
Ladykirk, Ladykirk and Norham Bridge
Lake of the Hirsel
Lambden
Lamberton
Lammer Law
Lammermuir Hills
Langhaugh
Langton Parish Church
Lanton, Lanton Moor, Lanton Tower, Lanton Wood
Lauder, Lauder Common
Lauderdale
Leadburn
Leader Water
Leaderfoot, Leaderfoot Viaduct
Leithen Water
Legerwood, Legerwood Kirk
Leitholm
Lempitlaw
Liddel Castle, Liddel Water
Liddesdale
Lilliesleaf
Lindean, Lindean Loch, Lindean Reservoir
Linhope
Lintlaw
Littledean Tower
Littledeanless
Longformacus
Luggate Water
Lumsdaine Moor
Lyne, Lyne Kirk, Lyne railway station, Lyne Viaduct, Lyne Water

M
Manderston House
Manor Water
Marchmont Estate, Marchmont House
Maxton

Maxwellheugh
Megget Reservoir, Megget Water
Mellerstain, Mellerstain House
Melrose, Melrose Abbey, Melrose railway station
Menzion
Mervinslaw Pele
Midlem
Millholm Cross
Minch Moor
Minto
Mire Loch
Moffat Hills
Monteviot House
Moorfoot Hills
Mordington
Morebattle
Mountbenger
Mountmill Roman Fortlet
Mowhaugh

N
Neidpath Castle, Neidpath Tunnel, Neidpath Viaduct
Nenthorn
Nether Horsburgh Castle
Nether Shiels
Newark Castle
Newbigging
Newcastleton
Newlands
Newmill-on-Teviot
Newstead
Newtown St Boswells
Ninestane Rig,
Nisbet, Nisbet Castle, Nisbet House
Northfield

O
Old Belses
Old Cambus
Old Gala House
Old Parish Church of Peebles
Oliver Castle
Oxnam, Oxnam Water
Oxton

P
Paxton, Paxton House
Pease Bay
Pease Dean
Peatrig Hill
Peebles, Old Parish Church of Peebles, Peebles Hydro
Peel Fell
Peniel Heugh
Penmanshiel Tunnel
Pennine Way
Pennymuir
Pentland Hills
Philiphaugh
Piperdean
Pirn Hill 
Plenderleith
Polmood
Polwarth, Polwarth Parish Church
Portmore Loch
Press Castle
Preston, Preston Bridge
Primrosehill
Priorwood Garden

Q
Quair Water

R
Redpath
Redscarhead
Reston
Riccarton Junction railway station
The Riggs
River Rede
River Teviot
River Till
River Tweed
Robert Smail's Printing Works
Roberton
Roman Heritage Way 
Romannobridge
Royal Border Bridge
Royal Tweed Bridge
Roxburgh, Roxburgh Castle
Roxburgh (village)
Rubers Law
Rule Water
Ruletownhead

S
Salenside
Saughtree, Saughtree railway station
Scots' Dike
Scott's View
Selkirk, Selkirk Castle, Selkirk Common
Shankend
Siccar Point
Simprim
Sir Walter Scott Way
Skirling
Skirmish Hill
Smailholm, Smailholm Tower
Soonhope
Sourhope
Southdean
Southern Upland Way
Soutra Aisle
Spittal-on-Rule
Sprouston
St. Abbs, St Abb's Head, St. Abbs and Eyemouth Voluntary Marine Reserve
St. Boswells, St. Boswells railway station
St. Cuthbert's Way
St. Mary's Loch
Stagehall
Stanhope
Stichill, Stichill Kirk
Stobo, Stobo Castle, Stobo Kirk, Stobo railway station
Stow of Wedale, Stow railway station
Sundhope
Swinside Hall
Swinton
Symington, Biggar and Broughton Railway

T
Talla Linnfoots, Talla Railway, Talla Reservoir, Talla Water
Teviothead
Thirlestane, Thirlestane Castle
Thornielee
Timpendean Tower
Torquhan
Torsonce,
Town Yetholm
Traquair, Traquair Forest, Traquair House 
Trimontium
Tweed Viaduct
Tweedbank, Tweedbank railway station
Tweedmouth railway station
Tweedsmuir

U
Union Bridge
Upper Hindhope
Upper Tweed Valley

V
Venlaw

W
Walkerburn
Watch Water, Watch Water Reservoir
Waterloo Monument
Wauchope, Wauchope Forest
Waverley Railway
Wedderburn Castle
West Linton
Westruther
Westwater Reservoir 
Whiteadder Water
Whitehope Law
Whithaugh Park
Whitlaw, Whitlaw Wood
Whitrope, Whitrope Siding, Whitrope Tunnel
Whitslaid Tower
Whitsome
William Chambers Birthplace
William Wallace Statue
Williamhope
Williamslee
Wilton
Wilton Dean
Windy Gyle
Windydoors
Woll
Wrae Tower

Y
Yair
Yarrow Stone
Yarrow Water
Yarrowford
Yearning Flow
Yetholm Loch

See also
List of places in Scotland

External links
Place-names and the Scots language: the marches of lexical and onomastic research, by Maggie Scott
RCAHMS records for Scottish Border
Gazetteer for Scotland

Lists of places in Scotland
Populated places in Scotland